Ishal is the melodic framework within which Mappila Songs are composed. Though identical to tala(metre (music)) and raga of Indian music, it has influences from the ancient folk songs of Kerala and Arabian musical traditions.

Ishals with its distinct tunes convey the emotion and mood of the lyrics being rendered. As mappila songs are also used in mappila performing arts like Oppana, Kolkali, Duffmuttu, etc.; the change in ishals changes the dance moves. 
 Ishals like Kuthirabaravu / Kuthirathalam meaning 'horse rhythm' gives the audience the feel of a galloping horse, with its distinctive rhythmic rendering.

Much of the recorded sources of ishals are Mappila literary works written in Arabi-Malayalam. Moyinkutty Vaidyar's work alone has used numerous different Ishals in composition. 
Oral transmission is another source of information on various ishals. Researches on Ishals are still underway.

List of known Ishals

Kombu, with its various sub categories.
Thongal
Bambu
Akanthar / Chayppu Virutham
Oppana Chayal & Oppana Murukkam
Hakkana
Mihraaj
Munajaat
Kavi
Maanitham Kwala & Maanitham Kwala Murukkam
Aadi Antham
Pukayinaar
Aaramba
Thalelam
Oosha Birutham
Makkanabi
Changu Kalangi / Chattamaettam
Mariyum Kinnaram
Kalithaalam
Akabhalippu
Ondan
Ketti Imaam
Virutham
Veerasha
Param Enikathil 
Veeraar
Naeshamaasha
Aashayul
Koolamammayil
Madanamani / Veervirutham
Kuthirabaravu

References 

Mappilas
Indian classical music
Indian folk music
Islamic music